Naela: The Remixes is the first remix album by Colombian recording artist Naëla. It was released as a digital download on September 22. 2014. The album contains remixes of tracks from her first two studio album—Naëla (2011) and Imparable (2014).

Track listing 
 Sin Mirar Atrás (Acoustic Country Version) — 3:51
 Tú (Bachata Version) — 3:46
 Esta Noche Mando Yo (Merengue Mambo Version) — 3:12
 Falso Amor (Video Version) — 3:21
 Muero Por Amarte (Ranchera Mexican Version) — 3:38
 Por Tu Amor (Merengue Urban Version) — 4:05

References

External links 
 Naela's Official Website

Naëla remix albums
2014 remix albums
Spanish-language remix albums
Trance remix albums